Malampuzha, is a village in Palakkad district of Kerala, South India, near to the Malampuzha Dam.

Transport
 Nearest railway station: Palakkad Junction - 15 km
 Nearest airport: Coimbatore International Airport - 55 km

Malampuzha Dam and Gardens
Malampuzha Dam is located 8 km from Palakkad town. It was built in 1955 and the garden was renovated recently.  The main attractions are the suspension bridge, the cable car ride and the Fantasy Park.  There are several gardens, including one Japanese garden.  The Yakshi statue of Kanayi Kunjiraman is also reputed even though the nudity of the structure is not approved by the conservative society of Kerala. The dam is accessible by bus and the last bus returns to town by 8.00 pm.  The nearest railway station is Palakkad Junction which is otherwise known as Olavakkode.

Important Landmarks
 Sai Nursing Hospital
 Akathethara Railway Gate
 Shabri Ashram
 NSS Engineering College
 Christian Brethren Church
 Govt ITI Malampuzha
 SI-MET Nursing College
 Ashram Tribal School
 Madurai Veeran Temple
 National Fish Seed Farm
 Malampuzha Dam and Gardens

Suburbs and Villages
 Alamkode (7C), Neelikkad, Rail Nagar, Andi Madam and Sneha Nagar
 Nadakkavu, Kallekkulangara, Devi Nagar and Chithra Junction
 Shiva Nagar, Shastha Nagar, Manthakkad and NPM Nagar
 Kripa Sadan Nagar and  Shri Krishna Nagar

Politics
Malampuzha assembly constituency is part of Palakkad (Lok Sabha constituency).

Gallery

Education
 Government ITI, Malampuzha
 Jawahar Navodaya Vidyalaya, Palakkad

See also
Malampuzha River
Palakkad
Kanayi Kunhiraman - sculptor
Malampuzha Dam

References

External links
Malampuzha Official Website
Malampuzha tourism

Villages in Palakkad district